Screen Gems is an American brand name used by Sony Pictures Entertainment Motion Picture Group, a subsidiary of Japanese multinational conglomerate, Sony Group Corporation. It has served several different purposes for its parent companies over the decades since its incorporation, initially as a cartoon studio, then a television studio, and later on as a film studio. The label currently serves as a film production and distribution label that specializes in genre films, mainly horror.

Animation studio (1921–1946)

Early years (1921–1933) 

When producer Pat Sullivan came to Harry Warner to sign a contract with him on his and Otto Messmer's series Felix the Cat, he declined and instead told his soon-to-be former secretary Margaret J. Winkler that she should form her own company and take control of the distribution of the series. Winkler formed M.J. Winkler Productions and soon also took control of Max and Dave Fleischer's series Out of the Inkwell. By 1923 she and Sullivan were arguing, and that same year the Fleischer Brothers formed their own distribution company named Red Seal. Winkler saw an unreleased short called Alice's Wonderland, a cartoon produced and directed by Walt Disney, and became impressed with the short. The two agreed to make a series about the cartoon. In 1924, Charles Mintz married Winkler, and the latter's career began to decline. Mintz quickly assumed Winkler's role in the company, later rebranding it Winkler Pictures. In 1925 Winkler's renewal contract for the Felix shorts was written, yet Winkler declined to renew due to her dispute with Sullivan. The following year the Alice Comedies stopped being distributed by Winkler. After Mintz become involved with the progress it was clear that Disney was unhappy with the production costs on cartoons, and he asked Disney and Ub Iwerks to develop a new character. The result was Oswald the Lucky Rabbit, the first animated character for Universal Pictures. In February 1928, when the character proved more successful than expected, Disney sought to meet with Mintz over the budget, wanting to spend more on the cartoons. Mintz refused, and hired away all of Walt Disney Studios' animators except Iwerks, Les Clark, and Johnny Cannon, who all refused to leave Disney. He moved the production of the Oswald cartoons to Winkler Pictures, along with Margaret Winkler's brother, George. After losing the Oswald contract to Walter Lantz, Mintz focused on the Krazy Kat series, which was the output of a Winkler-distributed property.

M.J. Winkler Productions became known as Winkler Pictures after Mintz took over in 1926 and partnered with Columbia Pictures for distribution in 1929. In 1931, when the studio moved from New York to California, it was renamed The Charles Mintz Studio.

Becoming Screen Gems (1933–1946) 
The Charles Mintz studio became known as Screen Gems in 1933. The name was originally used in 1933, when Columbia Pictures acquired a stake in Charles Mintz's animation studio. The name was derived from an early Columbia Pictures slogan, "Gems of the Screen"; itself a takeoff on the song "Columbia, the Gem of the Ocean". In 1939, a short while before his death, after becoming indebted to Columbia, Mintz relinquished ownership of his studio and the Screen Gems name to Columbia to settle longstanding financial problems.

Mintz was nominated for two Academy Awards for Best Short Subject. His first nomination was in 1935 for Holiday Land, and he was nominated again in 1938 for The Little Match Girl.

For an entire decade, Charles Mintz produced Krazy Kat, Scrappy, and Color Rhapsody animated film shorts through Columbia Pictures. Mintz's production manager became the studio head but was shortly replaced by Mintz's brother-in-law, George Winkler. Columbia then decided to "clean house" by ousting the bulk of the staff (including Winkler) and hiring creative cartoonist Frank Tashlin. After Tashlin's short stay came Dave Fleischer, formerly of the Fleischer Studios, and after several of his successors came Ray Katz and Henry Binder from Warner Bros. Cartoons (previously Leon Schlesinger Productions). Animators, directors, and writers at the series included people such as Art Davis, Sid Marcus, Manny Gould, Bob Wickersham, and during its latter period, Bob Clampett.

Like most studios, the Screen Gems studio had several established characters on their roster.  These included Flippity and Flop, Willoughby's Magic Hat, and Tito and His Burrito. However, the most successful characters the studio had been The Fox and the Crow, a comic duo of a refined Fox and a street-wise Crow.

Screen Gems was, in an attempt to keep costs low, the last American animation studio to stop producing black and white cartoons. The final black-and-white Screen Gems shorts appeared in 1946, over three years after the second-longest holdouts (Famous Studios and Leon Schlesinger Productions). During that same year, the studio shut its doors for good, though their animation output continued to be distributed until 1949. It later merged with the television version of Screen Gems (Previously Pioneer Telefilms).

The Screen Gems cartoons were only moderately successful in comparison to those of Walt Disney Animation Studios, Warner Bros. Cartoons, and Metro-Goldwyn-Mayer cartoon studio. The studio's purpose was assumed by an outside producer, United Productions of America (UPA), whose cartoons, including Gerald McBoing-Boing and the Mr. Magoo series, were major critical and commercial successes. Following UPA, a deal with Hanna Barbera was made in 1957, which lasted until 1967.

In 1999, Columbia TriStar International Television produced Totally Tooned In- a syndicated TV package showcasing Columbia's classic cartoon library. With the aid of animation historian Jerry Beck, Columbia restored and remastered the majority of the color Screen Gems cartoons (as well as all the UPA cartoons) from their original 35mm elements. The show aired in several international markets before making its American television debut on Antenna TV on January 8, 2011. They would later be aired on Toon In With Me on the MeTV Network in November 2021. Despite these restoration efforts, Sony Pictures Home Entertainment has no current plans to release these shorts on DVD or Blu-Ray.

Theatrical short film series 
 Krazy Kat (1925–39) (Inherited from Bray Productions)
 Oswald the Lucky Rabbit (1928–29) (moved from Disney)
 Toby the Pup (1930–31)
 Scrappy (1931–39)
 Color Rhapsodies (1934–49)
 Barney Google (1935–36)
 Fables (1939–42)
 Phantasies (1939–48)
 The Fox and the Crow (1943–46)
 Li'l Abner (1944)
 Flippy (1945–47)

Television subsidiary (1948–1974)

Early years (1948–1954) 

Ralph Cohn, the son of Columbia co-founder Jack Cohn and nephew of Columbia's head Harry Cohn, founded Pioneer Telefilms, a television commercial company in 1947. Ralph later wrote a 50-page memo arguing that Columbia should be the first major film studio to move into television. Although Harry wasn't convinced by the suggestion, Columbia invested $50,000 acquiring Pioneer and reorganized it as Screen Gems. The studio started its new business in New York on April 15, 1949.

By 1951, Screen Gems became a full-fledged television studio by producing and syndicating several popular shows (see below). Within a few months, Ralph Cohn had sold a half-hour dramatic anthology concept to the Ford Motor Company which became Ford Theatre, which was one of the first times a major Hollywood movie studio had produced content for television. They also produced seven episodes of the first season of Cavalcade of America.

The name "Screen Gems," at the time, was used to hide the fact that the film studio was entering television production and distribution. Many film studios saw television as a threat to their business, thus it was expected that they would shun the medium. However, Columbia was one of a few studios who branched out to television under a pseudonym to conceal the true ownership of the television arm. That is until 1955, when Columbia decided to use the woman from its logo under the Screen Gems banner, officially billing itself as a part of "the Hollywood studios of Columbia Pictures", as spoken in announcements at the end of some Screen Gems series.

By 1952, the studio had produced a series of about 100 film-record coordinated releases for television under the brand "TV Disk Jockey Toons" in which the films "synchronize perfectly with the records".

Rising success (1954–1968) 
In 1954, the studio started producing Father Knows Best on CBS and The Adventures of Rin Tin Tin on ABC, which became their biggest successes at the time.

On July 1, 1956, studio veteran Irving Briskin stepped down as stage manager of Columbia Pictures and formed his own production company Briskin Productions, Inc. to release series through Screen Gems and supervise all of its productions. On December 10, 1956, Screen Gems expanded into television syndication by acquiring Hygo Television Films (a.k.a. Serials Inc.) and its affiliated company United Television Films, Inc. Hygo Television Films was founded in 1951 by Jerome Hyams, who also acquired United Television Films in 1955 that was founded by Archie Mayers.

During that year, the studio began syndicating Columbia Pictures's theatrical film library to television, including the series of two-reel short subjects starring The Three Stooges in 1957. Earlier on August 2, 1957, they also acquired syndication rights to "Shock Theater", a package of Universal Pictures horror films (later shifted to MCA TV), which was enormously successful in reviving that genre.

From 1958 to 1974, under President John H. Mitchell and Vice President of Production Harry Ackerman, Screen Gems delivered TV shows and sitcoms: Dennis the Menace, The Donna Reed Show, Hazel, Here Come the Brides,  Mr. Smith Goes to Washington, Gidget, Bewitched, I Dream of Jeannie, The Flying Nun, The Monkees, and The Partridge Family.

It was also the original distributor for Hanna-Barbera Productions, an animation studio founded by William Hanna and Joseph Barbera after leaving Metro-Goldwyn-Mayer, and was also the distributor of the Soupy Sales show. The company also entered a co-production deal with Canada's CTV Television Network and produced several shows, many of which were filmed or taped in Toronto for distribution to Canadian stations (Showdown, The Pierre Berton Show). The company even expanded as far as Australia, opening Screen Gems Australia to produce shows for that country's networks, including The Graham Kennedy Show for the Nine Network.

In the late 1950s, Screen Gems also entered into ownership and operation of television stations. Stations owned by Screen Gems over the years included KCPX (Salt Lake City; now KTVX, owned by Nexstar Media Group), WVUE-DT (New Orleans; now owned by Gray Television), WAPA-TV (San Juan; now owned by the Hemisphere Media Group), WNJU (Linden, NJ; now Telemundo/NBCUniversal O&O), and several radio stations as well, including 50,000-watt clear channel WWVA (Wheeling, WV; now owned by iHeartMedia). As a result, in funding its acquisitions, 18% of Screen Gems' shares was spun off from Columbia and it became a publicly-traded company on the NYSE until 1968.

In 1963, William Dozier, who was one of the top Screen Gems employees, and senior vice president of production left to start out Greenway Productions, with a non-exclusive agreement with the studio for joint distribution of its TV productions. Even though none of Greenway's shows went to SG, Greenway immediately struck out a deal with rival television producer 20th Century-Fox Television in 1964.

From 1964 to 1969, former child star Jackie Cooper was Vice President of Program Development. He was responsible for packaging series (such as Bewitched) and other projects and selling them to the networks.

For the 1965–66 season, Screen Gems announced that they would sign three big creative programmers to develop new series, which was announced in June 1964. Among them was writer Sidney Sheldon, director Hy Averback, and writer David Swift.

In 1965, Columbia Pictures acquired a fifty per cent interest in the New York-based commercial production company EUE, which was incorporated into Screen Gems and renamed EUE/Screen Gems. The studios were sold in 1982 to longtime Columbia Pictures Executive, George Cooney, shortly after Columbia Pictures was sold to The Coca-Cola Company.

Later years (1968–1974) 
On December 23, 1968, Screen Gems merged with its parent company Columbia Pictures Corporation and became part of the newly formed Columbia Pictures Industries, Inc. for $24.5 million.

In the following year, former ABC vice president of programming Leonard Goldberg joined Screen Gems, displacing Jackie Cooper as vice president of program development. Although he failed to receive the same level of success as what Cooper did, Goldberg's packaging of shows all tanked after one season, with the exception of The Partridge Family, and abruptly left after three years, although the most notable of Goldberg's tenure at Screen Gems was the 1971 television movie Brian's Song. He then subsequently partnered with Aaron Spelling to co-venture his own production company.

In 1971, Douglas S. Cramer, former executive VP in charge of production at Paramount Television set up a SG-affiliated production company The Douglas S. Cramer Company to produce projects for feature films and TV projects via Columbia Pictures. In 1972, David Gerber, after he left 20th Century Fox Television, set up a SG-affiliated production company to produce their own projects. The most notable of which they produced is Police Story, an NBC police crime drama. In 1973, Allan Blye and Chris Bearde via Blye-Bearde Productions signed an independent production agreement with Screen Gems to develop their own projects. Also that year, Harry Ackerman, who was vice president of production left the studio to start his own production company to be affiliated with Paramount Television.

On May 6, 1974, Screen Gems was renamed to Columbia Pictures Television as suggested by then-studio president David Gerber, who succeeded Art Frankel as his studio president. The final notable production from this incarnation of Screen Gems before the name change was the 1974 miniseries QB VII. Columbia was, technically, the last major studio to enter television by name.

Changes in corporate ownership of Columbia came in 1982, when Coca-Cola bought the company, although continuing to trade under the CPT name.  In the mid-1980s, Coca-Cola reorganized its television holdings to create Coca-Cola Television, merging CPT with the television unit of Embassy Communications as Columbia/Embassy Television, although both companies continued to use separate identities until January 4, 1988, when it and Tri-Star Television were reunited under the CPT name. Columbia also ran Colex Enterprises, a joint venture with LBS Communications to distribute most of the Screen Gems library, which ended in 1986.

On December 21, 1987, Coca-Cola spun off its entertainment holdings and sold it to Tri-Star Pictures, Inc. for $3.1 billion. It was renamed to Columbia Pictures Entertainment, Inc., also creating Columbia/Tri-Star by merging Columbia and Tri-Star. Both studios continued to produce and distribute films under their separate names. In 1989, Sony Corporation of Japan purchased Columbia Pictures Entertainment. On August 7, 1991, Columbia Pictures Entertainment was renamed as Sony Pictures as a film production-distribution subsidiary and subsequently combined CPT with a revived TriStar Television in 1994 to form Columbia TriStar Television. The name "Screen Gems" was also utilized for a syndicated hour-long program for classic television called Screen Gems Network that first aired in 1999 and ran until 2002.

The television division is presently known as Sony Pictures Television.

Selected TV shows 
Television programs produced and/or syndicated by Screen Gems (most shows produced by Hanna-Barbera Productions) are now owned and distributed by Turner Entertainment, then Warner Bros. Television Distribution, except for Jeannie and Partridge Family 2200 A.D.) (see below):

 The Ford Television Theatre (1948–57)
 Cavalcade of America
 The George Burns and Gracie Allen Show (syndicated reruns of filmed episodes from 1952 to 1958)
 Art Linkletter's House Party (produced by John Guedel, 1952–1969)
 Captain Midnight [later rebranded on television as Jet Jackson, Flying Commando] (1954–1956)
 The Adventures of Rin Tin Tin (produced by Herbert B. Leonard, 1954–1959)
 Father Knows Best (1954–1960; Sony surrendered the rights to the estate of Robert Young)
 Tales of the Texas Rangers (1955–1957)
 Treasure Hunt (1956–1959)
 Playhouse 90 (selected filmed episodes, 1956–1960)
 Celebrity Playhouse (1955–1956)
 Jungle Jim (1955–1956)
 Ranch Party (1957–1958)
 Jefferson Drum (produced by Mark Goodson-Bill Todman Productions) (1958) 
 The Donna Reed Show (1958–66; Sony surrendered the rights to the estate of Donna Reed)
 Rescue 8 (1958–1960)
 Naked City (produced by Herbert B. Leonard) (1958–1963; Sony surrendered the rights to the estate of Herbert B. Leonard)
 Behind Closed Doors (1958–1959)
 Tightrope (1959–1960)
 Dennis the Menace (1959–1963)
 The Three Stooges [190 two-reel short films produced 1934–1958] (1959–1974; distributed thereafter by other Columbia/Sony divisions)
 Two Faces West (1960–1961); syndicated
 My Sister Eileen (1960–1961)
 Route 66 (produced by Herbert B. Leonard)  (1960–1964; Sony surrendered the rights to the estate of Herbert B. Leonard)
 Hazel (1961–1966)
 Grindl (1963–1964; produced by David Swift Productions)
 The Farmer's Daughter (1963–1966; Based on the 1947 movie produced by RKO Pictures)
 Bewitched (1964–1972; produced by Ashmont Productions 1971–1972)
 Days of Our Lives (produced by Corday Productions 1965–1974; produced thereafter by Columbia Pictures Television, Columbia TriStar Television and Sony Pictures Television)
 Camp Runamuck (1965–1966)
 Gidget (1965–1966)
 The Soupy Sales Show (1965–1966; produced by WNEW-TV in New York City)
 I Dream of Jeannie (1965–1970; produced by Sidney Sheldon Productions)
 Morning Star (1965–1966; in conjunction with Corday Productions)
 The Wackiest Ship in the Army (1965–1966)
 Hawk (1966)
 Love on a Rooftop (1966–1967)
 The Monkees (1966–1968; produced by Raybert Productions; currently owned by Warner Music Group through Rhino Entertainment, with Sony Pictures Television retaining syndication distribution)
 Adventures of the Seaspray (1967; produced by Pacific Films)
 Everybody's Talking (1967)
 The Flying Nun (1967–1970)
 The Second Hundred Years (1967–1968)
 Here Come the Brides (1968–1970)
 The Ugliest Girl in Town (1968–1969)
 The Johnny Cash Show (1969–1970)
 Playboy After Dark (1969–1970; produced by Playboy Enterprises)
 Nancy (1970–1971; produced by Sidney Sheldon Productions)
 The Partridge Family (1970–1974)
 The Young Rebels (1970–1971; produced by Aaron Spelling)
 Getting Together (1971–1972)
 The Good Life (1971–1972; produced by Lorimar Television)
 Bridget Loves Bernie (1972–1973)
 Ghost Story (1972-1973; produced by William Castle Productions)
 The Paul Lynde Show (1972–1973; produced by Ashmont Productions)
 Temperatures Rising (1972–1973; produced by Ashmont Productions)
 Needles and Pins (1973)
 The New Temperatures Rising Show (1973–1974; produced by Ashmont Productions)
 The Young and the Restless (produced by Bell Dramatic Serial Company and Corday Productions 1973–1974; produced thereafter by Columbia Pictures Television, Columbia TriStar Television and Sony Pictures Television)
 Bob & Carol & Ted & Alice (1973–1974)
 Police Story (produced by David Gerber Productions 1973–1974; produced thereafter by Columbia Pictures Television from 1974 to 1977)
 The Girl with Something Extra (1973–1974)
 Sale of the Century (1973–1974)
 That's My Mama (1974–1975; Slated to be a Screen Gems production but produced by its successor; Columbia Pictures Television)
 Nakia (1974–1975; Slated to be a Screen Gems production but produced by its successor; Columbia Pictures Television)
 Police Woman (1974–1978; Slated to be a Screen Gems production but produced by its successor; Columbia Pictures Television)
 Born Free (1974–1975; Slated to be a Screen Gems production but produced by its successor; Columbia Pictures Television)

Hanna-Barbera Productions 
Note: (*)= Currently owned by Turner Entertainment and Warner Bros. Discovery
 The Ruff and Reddy Show (1957–1960)*
 The Huckleberry Hound Show (1958–1961)*
 The Quick Draw McGraw Show (1959–1962)*
 The Flintstones (1960–1966)*
 The Yogi Bear Show (1961–1962)*
 Top Cat (1961–1962)*
 The Jetsons (1962–1963)*
 The Hanna-Barbera New Cartoon Series (1962–1963)*
 The Magilla Gorilla Show (1963–1967)*
 Peter Potamus (1964–1966)*
 Jonny Quest (1964–65)*
 The Atom Ant/Secret Squirrel Show (1965–1967)*
 Alice in Wonderland or What's a Nice Kid Like You Doing in a Place Like This? (1966)*
 Jeannie (1973)
 Partridge Family 2200 A.D. (1974)

Motion Pictures 
Note: (*) = Currently owned by Turner Entertainment and Warner Bros. Discovery

Motion picture adaptations of television programs produced and/or syndicated by Screen Gems, distributed by Columbia Pictures:
 Hey There, It's Yogi Bear! (1964; based on The Yogi Bear Show [1961–1962])*
 The Man Called Flintstone (1966; based on The Flintstones [1960–1966])*
 Head (1968; based on The Monkees [1966–1968])

Briskin Productions 
 Goodyear Theatre (1957–1960)
 Alcoa Theatre (1957–1960)
 Casey Jones (1958)
 The Donna Reed Show (1958–1966; full rights belong to the estate of Donna Reed since 2008)
 Manhunt (1959–1961)

Specialty feature film studio (1998–present) 

On December 8, 1998, Screen Gems was resurrected as a fourth speciality film-producing arm of Sony's Columbia TriStar Motion Picture Group. It was created after Triumph Films closed. Screen Gems produces and releases "films that fall between the wide-release films traditionally developed and distributed by Columbia Pictures and those released by Sony Pictures Classics". Many of its releases are of the horror, thriller, action, drama, comedy and urban genres, making the unit similar to Dimension Films (part of Lantern Entertainment), Hollywood Pictures (part of The Walt Disney Company), and Rogue Pictures (when it was formally owned by Relativity Media and before that, Universal Studios).

The highest-grossing Screen Gems film, as of March 2017, is Resident Evil: The Final Chapter, which grossed a total of $312,242,626 worldwide so far.

Screen Gems films

1990s–2000s

2010s

2020s

Upcoming releases

Undated films

References

External links 
 Archive of Screen Gems President John H. Mitchell
 The Columbia Crow's Nest – site dedicated to the Screen Gems animation studio.

 
American companies established in 1924
American companies disestablished in 1946
American companies established in 1948
American companies disestablished in 1974
American companies established in 1998
Sony Pictures Entertainment Motion Picture Group
Sony Pictures Entertainment
Predecessors of Sony Pictures Television
American animation studios
Film production companies of the United States
Mass media companies established in 1924
Mass media companies disestablished in 1946
Mass media companies established in 1948
Mass media companies disestablished in 1974
Mass media companies established in 1998
Re-established companies
Television syndication distributors
Sony subsidiaries
1924 establishments in California
1946 disestablishments in California
1948 establishments in California
1974 disestablishments in California
1998 establishments in California
Companies based in Culver City, California
Columbia Pictures
1933 mergers and acquisitions